The Tanzanian Championship (formerly, Second Division League and "Ligi Daraja la Kwanza" in Swahili) is the second tier of league football in Tanzania. The league is made up of sixteen teams that play thirty rounds, home and away.The league was formed in 1930.

The top two teams at the end of the season get promoted to the Tanzania Premier League, while the third and fourth go into a playoff with two last-placed teams not eligible for automatic relegation. The last two teams are relegated to the first division, while the last four teams go into a playoff. The two winners in the playoffs are retained, while the two losing teams are relegated to the First League.

2022–23 Tanzanian Championship League
 Mbuni
 Fountain Gate
 Kitayosce
 Mashujaa FC
 JKT
 Pamba Mwanza
 Biashara United Mara
 A.S.C.
 Transit Camp
 Kengold
 Pan African
 Mbeya Kwanza
 Copco
 Gwambina
 Green Warriors
 Ndanda

Fixtures/results

Group A
 African Lyon F.C. (Dar es Salaam) (relegated to this division for this season)
 Ashanti United S.C. (Dar es Salaam)
 Friends Rangers F.C. (Dar es Salaam)
 JKT Mgambo F.C. (Tanga)
 JKT Ruvu Stars F.C. (Dodoma) (relegated to this division for this season)
 Kiluvya United F.C. (Pwani Region)
 Mshikamano F.C. (Dar es Salaam)
 Mvuvumwa F.C. (Kigoma)

Group B
 Coastal Union F.C. (Tanga)
 JKT Mlale F.C. (Songea)
 Kinondoni Municipal Council F.C. (Dar es Salaam)
 Mawenzi Market F.C. (Morogoro) (promoted to this division for this season)
 Mbeya Warriors F.C. (Mbeya)
 Mufindi United F.C., formerly known as Kurugenzi F.C. (Iringa)
 Polisi Dar F.C. (Dar es Salaam)
 Tanzania Polisi F.C., formerly known as Polisi Morogoro F.C. (Moshi)

Group C
 Alliance Schools F.C. (Mwanza)
 Biashara United (Musoma), formerly known as Polisi Mara F.C.
 Dodoma F.C., formerly known as Polisi Dodoma F.C. (Dodoma)
 JKT Oljoro F.C. (Arusha, but playing in Moshi this season) (promoted to this division for this season)
 Pamba S.C. (Mwanza)
 Rhino Rangers F.C. (Tabora)
 Toto African S.C. (Mwanza) (relegated to this division for this season)
 Transit Camp F.C. (Shinyanga) (promoted to this division for this season)

Clubs and stadiums:

2016–17 season
The following teams participated in the 2016/17 First Division League:

Group A
 African Sports F.C. (Tanga) (relegated to this division for this season and then relegated to Second Division for 2017/18)
 Ashanti United S.C. (Dar es Salaam)
 Friends Rangers F.C. (Dar es Salaam)
 Kiluvya United F.C. (Pwani Region)
 Lipuli F.C. (Iringa) (promoted to Premier League for 2017/18)
 Mshikamano F.C. (Dar es Salaam) (promoted to this division for this season)
 Pamba S.C. (Mwanza) (promoted to this division for this season as a replacement for the teams relegated for match fixing in 2015/16)
 Polisi Dar F.C. (Dar es Salaam)

Group B
 Coastal Union F.C. (Tanga) (relegated to this division for this season)
 JKT Mlale F.C. (Songea)
 Kimondo Super S.C. (Mbeya) (failed to play its fixture on 28 January 2017 with JKT Mlale F.C. in Songea; penalties included disqualification from this competition, forfeiture of all group fixtures this season, and a two-level relegation to the regional competition for 2017/18)
 Kinondoni Municipal Council F.C. (Dar es Salaam)
 Kurugenzi F.C. (Iringa)
 Mbeya Warriors F.C. (Mbeya) (promoted to this division for this season)
 Njombe Mji F.C. (Njombe) (promoted to Premier League for 2017/18)
 Polisi Morogoro F.C. (Morogoro)

Group C
 Alliance Schools F.C. (Mwanza) (promoted to this division for this season)
 JKT Mgambo F.C. (Tanga) (relegated to this division for this season)
 Mvuvumwa F.C. (Kigoma) (promoted to this division for this season as a replacement for the teams relegated for match fixing in 2015/16)
 Panone F.C. (Moshi) (relegated to Second Division for 2017/18)
 Polisi Dodoma F.C. (Dodoma)
 Polisi Mara F.C. (Musoma)
 Rhino Rangers F.C. (Tabora)
 Singida United F.C. (Singida) (promoted to this division for this season and then promoted to Premier League for 2017/18)

2015–16 season
The following teams participated in the 2015/16 First Division League:

Group A
 African Lyon F.C. (Dar es Salaam) (promoted to Premier League for 2016/17)
 Ashanti United S.C. (Dar es Salaam)
 Friends Rangers F.C. (Dar es Salaam)
 Kiluvya United F.C. (Pwani Region) (promoted to this division for this season)
 Kinondoni Municipal Council F.C., formerly known as Tessema F.C. (Dar es Salaam)
 Mji Mkuu (CDA) F.C. (Dodoma) (promoted to this division for this season and then relegated to Second Division for 2016/17)
 Polisi Dar F.C. (Dar es Salaam)
 Polisi Dodoma F.C. (Dodoma)

Group B
 Burkinafaso F.C. (Morogoro) (relegated to Second Division for 2016/17)
 JKT Mlale F.C. (Songea)
 Kimondo Super S.C. (Mbeya)
 Kurugenzi F.C. (Iringa)
 Lipuli F.C. (Iringa)
 Njombe Mji F.C. (Njombe) (promoted to this division for this season)
 Polisi Morogoro F.C. (Morogoro) (relegated to this division for this season)
 Ruvu Shooting F.C. (Mlandizi) (relegated to this division for this season and then promoted to Premier League for 2016/17)

Group C
 Geita Gold S.C. (Geita) (penalized for fixing its 8-0 defeat of JKT Kanembwa by forfeiting all group games and being relegated to Second Division for 2016/17)
 JKT Kanembwa F.C. (Kigoma) (two-level relegation to regional competition for 2016/17, with one level resulting from fixing its 8-0 loss to Geita Gold F.C.; penalties also included forfeiture of all group games)
 JKT Oljoro F.C. (Arusha) (penalized for fixing its 7-0 loss to Polisi Tabora F.C. by forfeiting all group games and being relegated to Second Division for 2016/17)
 Mbao F.C. (Mwanza) (promoted to this division for this season; finished fourth on the field but elevated to first after four other teams forfeited all their group games; promoted to Premiere League for 2016/17)
 Panone F.C. (Moshi)
 Polisi Mara F.C. (Musoma)
 Polisi Tabora F.C. (Tabora) (penalized for fixing its 7-0 defeat of JKT Oljoro F.C. by forfeiting all group games and being relegated to Second Division for 2016/17)
 Rhino Rangers F.C. (Tabora)

2014–15 season
The following teams participated in the 2014/15 First Division League:

Group A
 African Lyon F.C. (Dar es Salaam)
 African Sports F.C. (Tanga) (promoted to this division for this season after winning Group A of the Regional Champions League in June 2014; promoted to Premier League for 2015/16)
 Ashanti United S.C. (Dar es Salaam) (relegated to this division for this season)
 Friends Rangers F.C. (Dar es Salaam)
 JKT Mlale F.C. (Songea)
 Kimondo Super S.C. (Mbeya)
 Kurugenzi F.C. (Iringa)
 Lipuli F.C. (Iringa)
 Maji Maji (Songea) (promoted to Premier League for 2015/16)
 Polisi Dar F.C. (Dar es Salaam)
 Tessema F.C. (Dar es Salaam)
 Villa Squad F.C. (Dar es Salaam)

Group B
 Burkinafaso F.C. (Morogoro)
 Geita Gold S.C. (Geita) (promoted to this division for this season after winning Group C of the Regional Champions League in June 2014)
 Green Warriors F.C. (Dar es Salaam) (relegated to Second Division for 2015/16)
 JKT Kanembwa F.C. (Kigoma)
 JKT Oljoro F.C. (Arusha) (relegated to this division for this season)
 Mwadui F.C. (Shinyanga) (promoted to Premier League for 2015/16)
 Panone F.C. (Moshi) (promoted to this division for this season after winning Group B of the Regional Champions League in June 2014)
 Polisi Dodoma F.C. (Dodoma)
 Polisi Mara F.C. (Musoma)
 Polisi Tabora F.C. (Tabora)
 Rhino Rangers F.C. (Tabora) (relegated to this division for this season)
 Toto African S.C. (Mwanza) (promoted to Premier League for 2015/16)

2013–14 season
The following teams participated in the 2013/14 First Division League:

Group A
 African Lyon F.C. (Dar es Salaam) (relegated to this division for this season)
 Friends Rangers F.C. (Dar es Salaam)
 Green Warriors F.C. (Dar es Salaam)
 Ndanda F.C. (Mtwara) (promoted to Premier League for 2014/15)
 Polisi Dar F.C. (Dar es Salaam)
 Tessema F.C. (Dar es Salaam)
 Transit Camp F.C. (Shinyanga) (relegated for 2014/15)
 Villa Squad F.C. (Dar es Salaam)

Group B
 Burkinafaso F.C. (Morogoro)
 JKT Mlale F.C. (Songea)
 Kimondo Super S.C. (Mbeya)
 Kurugenzi F.C. (Iringa)
 Lipuli F.C. (Iringa)
 Maji Maji F.C. (Songea)
 Mkamba Rangers F.C. (Morogoro) (relegated for 2014/15)
 Polisi Morogoro F.C. (Morogoro) (relegated to this division for this season and then promoted to Premier League for 2014/15)

Group C
 JKT Kanembwa F.C. (Kigoma)
 Mwadui F.C. (Shinyanga)
 Pamba S.C. (Mwanza) (relegated for 2014/15)
 Polisi Dodoma F.C. (Dodoma)        
 Polisi Mara F.C. (Musoma)
 Polisi Tabora F.C. (Tabora)
 Stand United F.C. (Shinyanga) (promoted to Premier League for 2014/15)
 Toto African S.C. (Mwanza) (relegated to this division for this season)

References

Football leagues in Tanzania